Jeff Tarango and Daniel Vacek won in the final 3–6, 6–3, 7–5 against Menno Oosting and Andrei Pavel.

Seeds

Draw

Finals

References

St. Petersburg Open
St. Petersburg Open
1999 in Russian tennis